Paculla is a genus of araneomorph spiders in the family Pacullidae that was first described by Eugène Louis Simon in 1887. Originally placed with the Tetrablemmidae, it was transferred to the Pacullidae after a 2017 genetic study.

Species
 it contains eight species, found in Indonesia, Malaysia, Singapore, and Papua New Guinea:
Paculla bukittimahensis Lin & Li, 2017 – Singapore
Paculla cameronensis Shear, 1978 – Malaysia
Paculla globosa Lin & Li, 2017 – Singapore
Paculla granulosa (Thorell, 1881) (type) – New Guinea
Paculla mului Bourne, 1981 – Borneo
Paculla negara Shear, 1978 – Malaysia
Paculla sulaimani Lehtinen, 1981 – Malaysia
Paculla wanlessi Bourne, 1981 – Borneo

See also
 List of Pacullidae species

References

Araneomorphae genera
Pacullidae
Spiders of Asia